In cricket, a five-wicket haul (also known as a "five-for" or "fifer") refers to a bowler taking five or more wickets in a single innings. This is regarded as a notable achievement. The Big Bash League (BBL) is a professional Twenty20 cricket league in Australia, which has been held annually since its first season in 2011–12. In the eleven seasons played, twenty-two five-wicket hauls have been taken by twenty different bowlers. Players from seven of the eight teams have taken five-wicket hauls.

The first five-wicket haul was taken by Lasith Malinga of the Melbourne Stars against the Perth Scorchers on 12 December 2012. Malinga took six wickets for seven runs, the best bowling figures in an innings by a player in the competition and one of only three six-wicket hauls. This also the most economical five-wicket haul taken with an economy rate of just 1.75 The next five-wicket haul came only 16 days later, taken by Daniel Christian of the Brisbane Heat against Sydney Thunder at ANZ Stadium in Sydney.

On 2 January 2017, Daniel Christian became the first player to achieve the feat twice. Now with the Sydney Sixers, Christian finished the match with 5/14. The most recent five-wicket haul was taken by Cameron Boyce of the Melbourne Renegades, he took 5/21 against the Sydney Thunder.

The list includes all the five-wicket hauls taken in the BBL, and is correct as of the 2021–22 season. The list does not cover the games played by the BBL teams in other tournaments, such as the Champions League Twenty20.

Key

Five-wicket hauls

Notes

See also
 List of Big Bash League centuries

References

Big Bash League five-wicket hauls
Five-wicket hauls